Zorgho  is a department or commune of Ganzourgou Province in central-eastern Burkina Faso. Its capital is the town of Zorgho. According to the 2019 census the department has a total population of 76,423.

Towns and villages
 Zorgho	(35,398 inhabitants) (capital)
 Bangbily	(503 inhabitants)
 Bissiga	(1,371 inhabitants)
 Bokin-Koudgo	(262 inhabitants)
 Bougré	(544 inhabitants)
 Dabèga	(501 inhabitants)
 Daguintoéga	(355 inhabitants)
 Digré	(1,369 inhabitants)
 Douré	(843 inhabitants)
 Gonkin	(345 inhabitants)
 Imiga	(897 inhabitants)
 Kidiba	(947 inhabitants)
 Kologuessom 	(208 inhabitants)
 Koubéogo	(658 inhabitants)
 Kourgou	(386 inhabitants)
 Nabitenga	(975 inhabitants)
 Sapaga	(3,316 inhabitants)
 Sapaga -Peulh	(500 inhabitants)
 Songdin	(987 inhabitants)
 Souka	(964 inhabitants)
 Taga	(515 inhabitants)
 Tamasgo	(931 inhabitants)
 Tamidou	(436 inhabitants)
 Tampelcé	(169 inhabitants)
 Tintogo	(1,450 inhabitants)
 Torodo	(2,085 inhabitants)
 Tuiré	(1,984 inhabitants)
 Tuiré-Peulh	(145 inhabitants)
 Yougoulmandé	(771 inhabitants)
 Zaïnga	(897 inhabitants)
 Zempassogo	(1,192 inhabitants)
 Zinado	(734 inhabitants)
 Zinguédéga	(890 inhabitants)

References

Departments of Burkina Faso
Ganzourgou Province